The Illinois Central West Line was a commuter line operated by the Illinois Central Railroad between the Randolph Street Station in Chicago and Addison, Illinois. The service began in 1892 and ended in 1931.

History

The Illinois Central Railroad opened a westerly line from Chicago to Freeport, Illinois in 1891. A suburban passenger service over a portion of this line between Chicago and Addison was inaugurated on May 1, 1892. Stations were initially located at Wabash Avenue and 16th Street, Crawford Avenue, Hyman (Cicero) Avenue, Robinson (Laramie) Avenue, Ogden Avenue, Parkview Avenue, Brook View, Hill Side, and South Addison. Service consisted of three trains in each direction Monday to Saturday and two trains in each direction on Sundays. A collision between an Addison suburban train and another locomotive occurred on February 25, 1893.

On April 15, 1931, the Illinois Central Railroad asked the Illinois Commerce Commission to allow discontinuance of passenger trains over the line. Discontinuance was granted and the commuter service ended.

Route
The West Line's eastern terminus was the Randolph Street Station on the east side of the Chicago Loop. From Randolph, trains traveled south over the suburban tracks of the Illinois Central's main line (still used by Metra Electric District trains). South of Roosevelt Road and Central Station, the West Line diverged from the main line between 14th and 16th Streets over a section of trackage that no longer exists that connected with what is now the Canadian National’s Freeport Subdivision. From there, the trains headed west to the vicinity of the South branch of the Chicago River, where the line angled to the southwest and roughly paralleled the river. Near 35th Street, the line crossed the river and continued west. From Central Avenue, it angled northwest through suburban Cicero, Berwyn, North Riverside, Hines, Broadview, Hillside, Elmhurst, and Villa Park, before reaching Addison. At the crossing of North Avenue in Addison, the line left the Freeport Subdivision , heading north along a branch on the west side of Addison Road before terminating in the vicinity of Lake Street.

Stations

References

Passenger trains of the Illinois Central Railroad
Railway lines in Chicago
Railway lines opened in 1892
Railway lines closed in 1931
1892 establishments in Illinois